Karl Wilhelm Otto Lilienthal (23 May 1848 – 10 August 1896) was a German pioneer of aviation who became known as the "flying man". He was the first person to make well-documented, repeated, successful flights with gliders, therefore making the idea of "heavier than air" a reality. Newspapers and magazines published photographs of Lilienthal gliding, favourably influencing public and scientific opinion about the possibility of flying machines becoming practical.

Lilienthal's work led to him developing the concept of the modern wing. His flight attempts in 1891 are seen as the beginning of human flight and the "Lilienthal Normalsegelapparat" is considered to be the first airplane in series production, making the Maschinenfabrik Otto Lilienthal in Berlin the first air plane production company in the world.

Otto Lilienthal is often referred to as either the "father of aviation" or "father of flight".

On 9 August 1896, his glider stalled and he was unable to regain control. Falling from about 15 m (50 ft), he broke his neck and died the next day.

Early life
Lilienthal was born on 23 May 1848 in Anklam, Pomerania Province, in the German kingdom of Prussia. His parents were Gustav and Caroline, née Pohle. He was baptised in the evangelical-lutheran St. Nicholas church and confirmed in St. Mary's church in Anklam. Lilienthal's middle-class parents had eight children, but only three survived infancy: Otto, Gustav, and Marie. The brothers worked together all their lives on technical, social, and cultural projects. Lilienthal attended grammar school and studied the flight of birds with his brother Gustav (1849–1933). Fascinated by the idea of manned flight, Lilienthal and his brother made strap-on wings, but failed in their attempts to fly. He attended the regional technical school in Potsdam for two years and trained at the Schwarzkopf Company before becoming a professional design engineer. He later attended the Royal Technical Academy in Berlin.

In 1867, Lilienthal began experiments in earnest on the force of air, but interrupted the work to serve in the Franco-Prussian War. Returning to civilian life, he was a staff engineer with several engineering companies and received a patent, his first, for a mining machine. He founded his own company to make boilers and steam engines.

On 6 June 1878, Lilienthal married Agnes Fischer, daughter of a deputy. Music brought them together; she was trained in piano and voice while Lilienthal played the French horn and had a good tenor voice. After marriage, they took up residence in Berlin and had four children: Otto, Anna, Fritz, and Frida. Lilienthal published his famous book Birdflight as the Basis of Aviation in 1889.

Experiments in flight

Lilienthal's greatest contribution was in the development of heavier-than-air flight. He made his flights from an artificial hill he built near Berlin and from natural hills, especially in the Rhinow region.

The filing of a U.S. Patent in 1894 by Lilienthal directed pilots to grip the "bar" for carrying and flying the hang glider. The A-frame of Percy Pilcher and Lilienthal echoes in today's control frame for hang gliders and ultralight aircraft.  Working in conjunction with his brother Gustav, Lilienthal made over 2,000 flights in gliders of his design starting in 1891 with his first glider version, the Derwitzer Glider, until his death in a gliding crash in 1896. His total flying time was five hours.

He could use the updraft of a 10 m/s wind against a hill to remain stationary with respect to the ground, shouting to a photographer on the ground to manoeuvre into the best position for a photo. This record remained unbeaten for him or anyone else at the time of his death.

Lilienthal did research in accurately describing the flight of birds, especially storks, and used polar diagrams for describing the aerodynamics of their wings. He made many experiments in an attempt to gather reliable aeronautical data.

Projects

During his short flying career, Lilienthal developed a dozen models of monoplanes, wing flapping aircraft and two biplanes. His gliders were carefully designed to distribute weight as evenly as possible to ensure a stable flight. Lilienthal controlled them by changing the center of gravity by shifting his body, much like modern hang gliders.  They were difficult to manoeuvre and had a tendency to pitch down, from which it was difficult to recover.  One reason for this was that he held the glider by his shoulders, rather than hanging from it like a modern hang glider.  Only his legs and lower body could be moved, which limited the amount of weight shift he could achieve.

Lilienthal made many attempts to improve stability with varying degrees of success.  These included making a biplane which halved the wing span for a given wing area, and by having a hinged tailplane that could move upwards to make the flare at the end of a flight easier.  He speculated that flapping wings of birds might be necessary and had begun work on such a powered aircraft.

While his lifelong pursuit was flight, Lilienthal was also an inventor and devised a small engine that worked on a system of tubular boilers. His engine was much safer than the other small engines of the time. This invention gave him the financial freedom to focus on aviation. His brother Gustav (1849–1933) was living in Australia at the time, and Lilienthal did not engage in aviation experiments until his brother's return in 1885.

There are 25 known Lilienthal patents.

Test locations
Lilienthal performed his first gliding attempts in mid-1891 at the so-called "Windmühlenberg" near to the villages of Krielow and Derwitz, west of Potsdam.

In 1892, Lilienthal's training area was a hill formation called "Maihöhe" in Steglitz, Berlin. The shed served also for storing his apparatus.

In 1893, Lilienthal also started to perform gliding attempts in the "Rhinower Berge", at the "Hauptmannsberg" near to Rhinow and later, in 1896, at the "Gollenberg" near to Stölln.

In 1894, Lilienthal built an artificial conical hill near his home in Lichterfelde, called Fliegeberg (lit. "Fly Hill"). It allowed him to launch his gliders into the wind no matter which direction it was coming from. There was a regular crowd of people that were interested in seeing his gliding experiments.

In 1932, the Fliegeberg was redesigned by a Berlin architect Fritz Freymüller as a memorial to Lilienthal. On top of the hill was built a small temple-like construction, consisting of pillars supporting a slightly sloping round roof. Inside is placed a silver globe inscribed with particulars of famous flights. Lilienthal's brother Gustav and the old mechanic and assistant Paul Baylich attended the unveiling ceremony on 10 August 1932 (36 years after Otto's death).

Worldwide notice
Reports of Lilienthal's flights spread in Germany and elsewhere, with photographs appearing in scientific and popular publications. Among those who photographed him were pioneers such as Ottomar Anschütz and American physicist Robert Williams Wood. He soon became known as the "father of flight" as he had successfully controlled a heavier-than-air aircraft in sustained flight.

Lilienthal was a member of the Verein zur Förderung der Luftschifffahrt, and regularly detailed his experiences in articles in its journal, the Zeitschrift für Luftschifffahrt und Physik der Atmosphäre, and in the popular weekly publication Prometheus. These were translated in the United States, France and Russia. Many people from around the world came to visit him, including Samuel Pierpont Langley from the United States, Russian Nikolai Zhukovsky, Englishman Percy Pilcher and Austrian Wilhelm Kress. Zhukovsky wrote that Lilienthal's flying machine was the most important invention in the aviation field. Lilienthal corresponded with many people, among them Octave Chanute, James Means, Alois Wolfmüller and other flight pioneers.

Final flight
On 9 August 1896, Lilienthal went, as on previous weekends, to the Rhinow Hills. The day was very sunny and not too hot (about 20 °C, or 68 °F). During the fourth flight Lilienthal's glider pitched forward, heading down quickly. Lilienthal had previously had difficulty in recovering from this position because the glider relied on weight shift which was difficult to achieve when pointed at the ground.

Paul Beylich, Lilienthal's glider mechanic, transported him by horse-drawn carriage to Stölln, where he was examined by a physician. Lilienthal had a fracture of the third cervical vertebra and soon became unconscious. Later that day he was transported in a cargo train to Lehrter train station in Berlin, and the next morning to the clinic of Ernst von Bergmann, one of the most famous and successful surgeons in Europe at the time. Lilienthal died there a few hours later (about 36 hours after the crash).

There are differing accounts of Lilienthal's last words. A popular account, inscribed on his tombstone, is "" ("Sacrifices must be made!"). The director of the Otto Lilienthal Museum doubts that these were his last words. Otto Lilienthal was buried at Lankwitz public cemetery in Berlin.

Legacy
Lilienthal's research was well known to the Wright brothers, and they credited him as a major inspiration for their decision to pursue manned flight. They abandoned his aeronautical data after two seasons of gliding and began using their own wind tunnel data.

Before its closure in 2020, Berlin's then busiest airport, Berlin Tegel "Otto Lilienthal" Airport, was named after him.

In September 1909, Orville Wright was in Germany making demonstration flights at Tempelhof aerodrome. He paid a call to Lilienthal's widow and, on behalf of himself and Wilbur, paid tribute to Lilienthal for his influence on aviation and on their own initial experiments in 1899.

In 1972, Lilienthal was inducted into the International Air & Space Hall of Fame.

In 2013, American aviation magazine Flying ranked Lilienthal No. 19 on their list of the "51 Heroes of Aviation".

A German Air Force tanker, Airbus A310 MRTT registration 10-24, has been named "Otto Lilienthal" in his honour.

The Lilium Jet, a prototype German electric vertical take-off and landing (eVTOL) electrically powered airplane and the company which designed it, Lilium GmbH, were named after him.

An authentic replica of the Normalsegelapparat made by the Otto Lilienthal Museum have been investigated by the German Aerospace Center in wind tunnel and flight tests. The results prove that the glider was stable in pitch and roll and can be flown safely at moderate altitudes.

In popular culture
 Lilienthal was featured on a commemorative postmark in Berlin in 1953.
 Lilienthal plays a major part (in absentia) in Theodora Goss's short story "The Wings of Meister Wilhelm," nominated for a World Fantasy Award and published in her anthology In the Forest of Forgetting.
 A Lilienthal glider serves as a major plot element in Paul Gazis's Webserial "The Airship Flying Cloud, R-505".
 "Lilienthals Traum" ("Lilienthal's Dream") is a song by Reinhard Mey that charts Lilienthal's flights and death.
 "Lilienthal Berlin" is a German watch brand named after Otto Lilienthal

Gallery
Lilienthal was regularly joined by photographers at his request. Most of them are well known, like Ottomar Anschütz. Lilienthal also took his own photographs of his flying machines after 1891. There are at least 145 known photographs documenting his test flights, some of excellent quality. All of them are available online at the Otto Lilienthal Museum website. The only negatives, preserved in the Deutsches Museum in Munich, were destroyed during World War II.

See also

 Lilienthal Gliding Medal
 Otto Lilienthal Museum
 Aviation history
 Albrecht Berblinger
 Abbas Ibn Firnas
 George Cayley
 Jean-Marie Le Bris
 John Joseph Montgomery
 German inventors and discoverers

References

Notes

Bibliography
 Anderson, John D. A History of Aerodynamics and Its Impact on Flying Machines. Cambridge, UK: Cambridge University Press, 2001, First edition 1999. .
 Crouch, Tom D. The Bishop's Boys: A Life of Wilbur and Orville Wright. New York: W. W. Norton & Company, 1989. .
 Jarret, Philip. "Soaring Inspiration: Otto Lilienthal's Influence in Britain". Air Enthusiast, No. 65, September–October 1996, pp. 2–7. .
 Lilienthal, Otto. Birdflight as the Basis of Aviation.  First edition, 1911 reprinted 2001: . (Translation from German edition, Berlin 1889: Der Vogelflug als Grundlage der Fliegekunst reprinted 2003: .)
 Nitsch, Stephan. Vom Sprung zum Flug (From the jump to the flight). Berlin, Brandenburgisches Verlagshaus, 1991. . Modified second edition: Die Flugzeuge von Otto Lilienthal.  Technik - Dokumentation - Rekonstruktion. (The airplanes of Otto Lilienthal. Technique - Documentation - Reconstruction). Otto-Lilienthal-Museum Anklam, 2016. .

External links

 Biography / family tree of Otto Lilienthal
 Lilienthal's appendix from Chanute's book Progress in Flying Machines 1893.
   Movies and simulations
 "Lilienthal in England" a 1967 Flight article
 
Otto Lilienthal (1889) Der Vogelflug als Grundlage der Fliegekunst - digital facsimile from Linda Hall Library
Otto Lilienthal (1911) Birdflight as the basis of aviation, compiled from the results of numerous experiments made by O. and G. Lilienthal - digital facsimile from Linda Hall Library
 

 
1848 births
1896 deaths
19th-century German aviation
19th-century German inventors
Aviation inventors
Aviation pioneers
Aviators killed in aviation accidents or incidents in Germany
Engineers from Mecklenburg-Western Pomerania
German aerospace engineers
German aviation record holders
German glider pilots
German people of Swedish descent
Glider flight record holders
Inventors killed by their own invention
People from Anklam
People from the Province of Pomerania
Victims of aviation accidents or incidents in 1896